The  opened in Usa, Ōita Prefecture, Japan in 1998, replacing the  of 1981.  It is one of Japan's many museums which are supported by a prefecture.

The collection is organised around themes including life and ancient Buddhism in Toyo no kuni and the Kunisaki peninsula, and the culture  of Usa Hachiman-gū and Fuki-ji.

See also
 Usa Hachiman-gū
 Fuki-ji
 Prefectural museum

References

External links
   Ōita Prefectural Museum of History

Museums in Ōita Prefecture
History museums in Japan
Prefectural museums
Museums established in 1998
1998 establishments in Japan